Impossible is Nothing may refer to:
A commercial slogan by sports apparel manufacturer Adidas
Impossible Is Nothing (video résumé), an inadvertently humorous video by internet phenomenon Aleksey Vayner
"Impossible Is Nothing" (Iggy Azalea song)
"Impossible Is Nothing" (Tonic Breed song)

See also
 Nothing Is Impossible (disambiguation)